Antonio de Rojas Manrique (died 27 June 1527) was a Roman Catholic prelate who served as Patriarch of the West Indies (1524–1527),
Bishop of Burgos (1525–1527),
Bishop of Palencia (1524–1525),
Archbishop of Granada (1507–1524),
Bishop of Mallorca (1496–1507), 
and President of the Council of Castile (1519–1524).

Biography
In 1496, Antonio de Rojas Manrique was selected by the King of Spain and confirmed by Pope Alexander VI as  Bishop of Mallorca. 
He was one of the three ambassadors to England that left on 26 August 1501 to accompany princess Catherine of Aragon on her marriage to Arthur, Prince of Wales.
The others were Diego Fernández de Córdoba y Mendoza, 3rd Count of Cabra, and  Alonso de Fonseca, archbishop of Santiago de Compostela.
In 1507, he was appointed by Pope Julius II as Archbishop of Granada. In 1524, he was appointed by Pope Clement VII as Bishop of Palencia and the first Patriarch of the West Indies. On 3 July 1525, he was appointed by Pope Clement VII as Bishop of Burgos. He served as Bishop of Burgos and Patriarch of West Indies until his death on 27 June 1527.

References

External links and additional sources
 (for Chronology of Bishops) 
 (for Chronology of Bishops) 
 (for Chronology of Bishops) 
 (for Chronology of Bishops) 
 (for Chronology of Bishops) 
 (for Chronology of Bishops) 
 (for Chronology of Bishops) 
 (for Chronology of Bishops) 
 (for Chronology of Bishops) 
 (for Chronology of Bishops) 

1527 deaths
16th-century Roman Catholic archbishops in New Spain
Bishops appointed by Pope Alexander VI
Bishops appointed by Pope Julius II
Bishops appointed by Pope Clement VII
Archbishops of Granada
16th-century Roman Catholic archbishops in Spain